Aisha (–678), was the third wife of Muhammad.

Aisha or variant spellings, may also refer to:

Arts and entertainment

Film
 Aisha (1953 film), an Egyptian drama
 Aisha (2010 film), an Indian romantic comedy-drama 
 Aisha (2022 film), an Irish drama
Aayisha, a 1964 Indian Malayalam film

Music
"Aisha", a song by John Coltrane from the 1961 album Olé Coltrane
"Aisha", a 1999 song by Death in Vegas
"Aïcha", a 1996 song by Khaled
"Aïcha", a 2003 song by Singuila
"Ayesha", a 2019 song by Cupcakke

Other uses in arts and entertainment
Ayesha (novel), by H. Rider Haggard, 1905, a sequel to She
Aisha (TV series), a Maldivian television series
Kismet (Marvel Comics), a fictional character also known as Ayesha 
 Aisha, a character from the Italian animated series Winx Club

People
Aisha (given name), an Arabic female given name, including a list of people and fictional characters with the name
Aisha (Latvian singer) (Aija Andrejeva, born 1986)
Aisha (poet) (ʿĀʾisha bint Aḥmad al-Qurṭubiyya), a 10th-century poet 
Aisha (reggae singer) (Pamela Ross, born 1962), a British singer
Aishah (singer) (Wan Aishah binti Wan Ariffin, born 1965), a Malaysian singer and politician
Aisha (아샤), member of South Korean girl group Everglow

Places
Ayesha (woreda), Ethiopia
Aysha, Ethiopia is a town located in the woreda
Ayesha River, Ethiopia

Other uses
 Ayesha (cicada), a genus of cicadas 
 Aysha (spider), a genus of spiders
 Ayesha (ship), a wooden topsail schooner, launched 1907
 Aisha Association for Woman and Child Protection
 Ayesha pole move, an advanced pole dance position

See also

 Aysheaia, an extinct genus of fossil organisms
"Iesha", a 1990 song by Another Bad Creation